The Academy School is an independent preparatory school for boys and girls aged between 6 and 13.  It is located in Hampstead, London and has been operating since 1997.

Operation
Children are accepted at any point in the academic year and at any point in their academic career.

The school aims to '...give pupils the confidence and grounding they require in order to meet their objectives and achieve entrance into their next schools... Within a culture of mutual respect and equality, the school also aims for the children to value themselves as the individuals they are'.

The Academy School has received consistently high ratings from sources such as The Good Schools Guide.

References

External links
 

1997 establishments in England
Educational institutions established in 1997
Private co-educational schools in London
Private schools in the London Borough of Camden
Preparatory schools in London
Schools in Hampstead